Kate McGarrigle (February 6, 1946 – January 18, 2010) and Anna McGarrigle (born December 4, 1944) were a duo of Canadian singer-songwriters (and sisters) from Quebec, who performed until Kate McGarrigle's death on January 18, 2010.

Music career
In the 1960s, in Montreal, while Kate was studying engineering at McGill University and Anna art at the École des beaux-arts de Montréal, they began performing in public and writing their own songs. From 1963 to 1967 they teamed up with Jack Nissenson and Peter Weldon to form the folk group Mountain City Four.

Their songs have been covered by a variety of artists including Linda Ronstadt, Emmylou Harris, Judy Collins, and others. These covers led to the McGarrigles getting their first recording contract in 1974. They released their eponymous debut album in 1976, and created nine more albums through 2008.

Although associated with Quebec's anglophone community, they also recorded and performed many songs in French. Two of their albums, Entre la jeunesse et la sagesse and La vache qui pleure, are entirely in French.

Their version of Wade Hemsworth's song, "The Log Driver's Waltz" grew famous as the soundtrack for a 1979 animated film directed by John Weldon at Canada's National Film Board. They provided backing vocals on Nick Cave and the Bad Seeds's 2001 album No More Shall We Part.

They continued to write, record and perform music into the 21st century, with assorted accompanying artists including Gerry Conway, Pat Donaldson, Ken Pearson, Michel Pépin, Chaim Tannenbaum and Joel Zifkin.

Personal lives
Anna and Kate McGarrigle were born in Montreal of mixed Irish- and French-Canadian background. They grew up in Saint-Sauveur, where they learned piano from nuns. 

Kate McGarrigle was married in 1971 to singer-songwriter Loudon Wainwright III. Their children, Rufus and Martha, are both singers too. The two divorced in 1976. Kate McGarrigle died in 2010, aged 63, of sarcoma, a rare form of cancer.

Anna McGarrigle is married to Canadian journalist and author Dane Lanken. The couple have two children, Lily Lanken and Sylvan Lanken, and live in North Glengarry, Ontario, just west of the Quebec border. Dane appeared as a vocalist on several of the sisters' albums and in 2007 wrote their career biography.

Another sister, Jane McGarrigle (born April 26, 1941), is a film and television composer who acted as business manager for Kate and Anna, and also wrote and performed several songs with the duo.

Honours and awards
They were appointed Members of the Order of Canada in 1993 and received the Governor General's Performing Arts Award in 2004.

On November 22, 2006, they received the Lifetime Achievement Award at the 2006 SOCAN Awards in Toronto.

On November 18, 2010, they were recipients of the Mojo Roots Award, presented by Emmylou Harris. The award was accepted by Anna McGarrigle and Kate's two children Rufus and Martha Wainwright, as Kate had died early in the year on January 18.

Discography

Albums
 Kate & Anna McGarrigle (1976) - Sweden #27
 Dancer with Bruised Knees (1977) - U.K. #35, Canada #43
 Pronto Monto (1978)
 Entre la jeunesse et la sagesse (1980) – also known by the title French Record
 Love Over and Over  (1982)
 Heartbeats Accelerating (1990) - Canada #61
 Matapédia (1996) – winner of 1997 Juno Award for Roots & Traditional Album of the Year – Group)
 The McGarrigle Hour (1998) – winner of 1999 Juno Award for Roots & Traditional Album of the Year – Group)
 La vache qui pleure (2003)
 The McGarrigle Christmas Hour (2005)
 ODDiTTiES (2010)
 Tell My Sister (2011)
 Sing Me the Songs: Celebrating the Works of Kate McGarrigle (2013)
 Toronto May '82 (unofficial) (2016)

With other artists
Album II BY Loudon Wainwright (1971), Kate McGarrigle - vocals on "Old Paint"
Attempted Mustache by Loudon Wainwright, Kate McGarrigle banjo and vocals. 
 Waitress in a Donut Shop by Maria Muldaur (1974) – "Cool River", "Travelin' Shoes (Kate only)"
 Prisoner in Disguise by Linda Ronstadt (1975) – "You Tell Me That I'm Falling Down"
Unrequited by Loudon Wainwright, Kate & Anna McGarrigle, vocals. 
 Sunnyvista by Richard and Linda Thompson (1979) – "You're Gonna Need Somebody", "Sisters", "Traces of My Love"
 Bluebird by Emmylou Harris (1989) – "Love Is"
 Songs of the Civil War (1991) – "Was My Brother in the Battle?", "Better Times Are Coming", "Hard Times Come Again No More"
 The Bells of Dublin (1991) – "Il Est Né/Ca Berger" with The Chieftains
  'Til Their Eyes Shine (The Lullaby Album) (1992) – "Lullaby For A Doll"
History (III Album) by Loudon Wainwright, Kate & Anna McGarrigle, vocals. 
 Wrecking Ball by Emmylou Harris (1995) – "Going Back To Harlan", "Waltz Across Texas Tonight"
 Live at the World Cafe: Volume 9 (1999) – "DJ Serenade"
 Western Wall: The Tucson Sessions by Emmylou Harris and Linda Ronstadt (1999) – "All I left behind you", "1917", "Sisters of mercy"
 Red Dirt Girl by Emmylou Harris (2000) – "J'Ai Fait Tout" (Kate only, instrumentals), "Boy From Tupelo" (Kate only, vocals)
 No More Shall We Part by Nick Cave and the Bad Seeds (2001)
 Stumble into Grace by Emmylou Harris (2003) – "I Will Dream", "Little Bird", "O Evangeline", "Cup of kindness" (Kate only)
Martha Wainwright by the latter, Kate McGarrigle – banjo (track 3), piano (track 6). 
 Leonard Cohen: I'm Your Man Soundtrack (2006) – "Winter Lady" (with Martha Wainwright)
 All I Intended to Be by Emmylou Harris (2008) – "Moon Song", "Sailing 'Round The Room", "How She Could Sing the Wildwood Flower"
I Know You're Married But I've Got Feelings Too by Martha Wainwright, Anna McGarrigle – keyboard, synths and background vocals (12), Kate McGarrigle – hand claps (2), Wurlitzer (12), backing vocals (12)
 Northern Songs: Canada's Best and Brightest (2008) – "Entre Lajeunesse et la Sagesse"
 Easy Come, Easy Go by Marianne Faithfull (2008) – Kate & Anna McGarrigle vocals on "Flandyke Shore"

Filmography

DVDs

 The McGarrigle Hour (1999) – with Rufus Wainwright, Martha Wainwright, Loudon Wainwright, Chaim Tannenbaum, Jane McGarrigle, Emmylou Harris, Linda Ronstadt and Lily Lanken).
2009 – A Not So Silent Night (2009) – with Rufus and Martha Wainwright.

Film work
 The Log Driver's Waltz (1979) - an NFB animated short of the Wade Hemsworth song directed by John Weldon
 The sisters were the subject of an eponymous documentary film directed by Caroline Leaf.  (1981)
 Blackfly (1991) – back up vocals on a Wade Hemsworth performance of the song featured in the animated film by Christopher Hinton.
 Before Tomorrow (Le Jour avant le lendemain) (2008) – a Canadian drama film, adapted from the novel Før morgendagen by Danish writer Jørn Riel.

Bibliography

See also
List of Quebec musicians
Music of Quebec
Culture of Quebec

Notes

References

External links
 Kate and Anna McGarrigle official web site
 Kate and Anna McGarrigle at Encyclopedia of Music in Canada
 
 
 
 Documentary film
 Lanken, Dane (2007). Kate and Anna McGarrigle: Songs and Stories. Manotick, Ontario: Penumbra Press.

 
Musical groups established in 1975
Musical groups disestablished in 2010
Musical groups from Montreal
Canadian folk music groups
English-language musical groups from Quebec
Sibling musical duos
Canadian musical duos
Governor General's Performing Arts Award winners
Private Music artists
Juno Award for Roots & Traditional Album of the Year – Group winners
McGarrigle-Wainwright-Roche family
Folk music duos
Female musical duos